The California Coastal Records Project, founded in 2002, documents the California coastline with aerial photos taken from a helicopter flying parallel to the shore. Their webpage provides access to these images. One photo was taken every 500 feet.

The entire California coast is included, except sections of Vandenberg Space Force Base (although some historical photos are included from an earlier survey in 1989). Most of the coast has been photographed several times, and the website has an interface for comparing photos taken during different years. Kenneth and Gabrielle Adelman were recipients of the 2004 Ansel Adams Award for Conservation Photography  from the Sierra Club for their work on the project.

Streisand effect 
The project was sued in 2003 by Barbra Streisand, who claimed they infringed upon her privacy by displaying photographs of her Malibu home. The project countersued under the SLAPP provisions of California law and prevailed in court. The lawsuit drew additional public attention to Streisand's home, giving name to the Streisand effect: the phenomenon where attempting to hide or censor information instead draws greater attention to the information.

Notes

References

External links 
 California Coastal Records Project

Geography of California
2002 establishments in California
Aerial photography
Coastal erosion in the United States